Shoval Gozlan (born 25 April 1994) is an Israeli footballer who plays as a striker for Hapoel Haifa.

Career
Gozlan made his debut in the senior team in January 2012 against Hapoel Nir Ramat HaSharon. His debut goal was in December 2013 against Hapoel Acre in the 86th minute. He also scored his first goal in Europe against Shakhter Karagandy, in the UEFA Europa League group stage.

On 14 July 2014 Gozlan was loaned to Hapoel Tel Aviv. In the January transfer window, After Dudu Biton and Amido Baldé signed with Hapoel, his loan was terminated. On 19 January 2015 he was loaned to Hapoel Ra'anana.

Honours

Club
Maccabi Haifa
Israel State Cup (1): 2015–16

References

External links

1994 births
Living people
Israeli footballers
Maccabi Haifa F.C. players
Hapoel Tel Aviv F.C. players
Hapoel Ra'anana A.F.C. players
Hapoel Ironi Kiryat Shmona F.C. players
Maccabi Netanya F.C. players
Enosis Neon Paralimni FC players
F.C. Ashdod players
Hapoel Hadera F.C. players
Hapoel Haifa F.C. players
Israel under-21 international footballers
Israeli Premier League players
Cypriot First Division players
Israeli people of Moroccan-Jewish descent
Footballers from Tiberias
Israeli expatriate footballers
Expatriate footballers in Cyprus
Israeli expatriate sportspeople in Cyprus
Association football forwards